A War Story Book II is the third studio album by American hip hop group Psycho Realm, and possibly their final album due to Duke's paralyzation. Although Duke was paralyzed when the album was released, they had about half of the album finished before Duke was shot. Their former bandmate B-Real was not featured on any of the songs. Crow and Cynic from the Street Platoon are the only guests on this record.

Track listing

Personnel
Joaquin Gonzalez - vocals, producer, mastering, mixing
Gustavo Gonzalez - vocals, producer
Carlos Vargas - vocals (tracks: 4, 14)
Richard Alfaro - vocals (tracks: 4, 15)
Jim Muse - additional vocals (track 13)
Menno - backing vocals, guitar, keyboards, mastering, mixing, recording
Eric Lance Correa - percussion
Jay Turner - scratches
Jose 'Chico' Obregon - additional producer (track 5)

References

2003 albums
Psycho Realm albums